Rocky Dennis in Heaven is an extended play by Swedish indie pop musician Jens Lekman. It was released on 21 January 2004 on Service. The EP was later released as simply Rocky Dennis on 6 April 2004 on Secretly Canadian. The EP's songs were written about the life and artistic biographies of Roy L. Dennis, who suffered from the extremely rare medical condition known as craniodiaphyseal dysplasia.

The Swedish release showed a sky blue cover with the words, "Someday I'll be stuffed in a museum, scaring little kids / With the inscription Carpe diem, something I never did". The songs on the EP can also be found on Lekman's 2005 release, Oh You're So Silent Jens.

Track listing

Charts

See also
Rocky Dennis – a boy who suffered craniodiaphyseal dysplasia about whom the Rocky Dennis in Heaven EP was written

References

2004 EPs
Jens Lekman EPs